Perry McGillivray (August 5, 1893 – July 27, 1944) was an American competition swimmer and water polo player who represented the United States at the 1912 Summer Olympics and 1920 Summer Olympics.

In the 1912 Olympics he competed in the 100-meter freestyle and reached the semifinal. He also was a member of the United States' 4×200-meter freestyle relay team, which won a silver medal.

Eight years later he was fourth in the 100-metre backstroke and won a gold medal as a member of the United States' 4×200-meter freestyle relay team. He also played three matches for the United States water polo team, which finished fourth.

In 1976, he was inducted into the USA Water Polo Hall of Fame.

See also
 List of members of the International Swimming Hall of Fame
 List of Olympic medalists in swimming (men)
 World record progression 4 × 200 metres freestyle relay

References

External links
 

1893 births
1944 deaths
American male backstroke swimmers
American male freestyle swimmers
American male water polo players
World record setters in swimming
Olympic gold medalists for the United States in swimming
Olympic silver medalists for the United States in swimming
Water polo players from Chicago
Swimmers at the 1912 Summer Olympics
Swimmers at the 1920 Summer Olympics
Water polo players at the 1920 Summer Olympics
Medalists at the 1920 Summer Olympics
Medalists at the 1912 Summer Olympics
American water polo coaches
Swimmers from Chicago
19th-century American people
20th-century American people